Milovan Glišić (6 January 1847 – 20 January 1908) was a Serbian writer, dramatist, translator, and literary theorist.  He is sometimes referred to as the Serbian Gogol.

Legacy

Glišić is considered to be one of the best translators of his time and several of his short stories including Prva Brazda and Glava Šećera are studied in Serbian schools and included in various anthologies of short stories.
His translations of Russian writers Gogol and Tolstoy severely influenced Serbian culture of that time and future  writers Stevan Sremac, Svetozar Ćorović, Branislav Nušić and many others.

According to Slobodan Jovanović, Glišić was one of the first Serbian short story writers to attempt a more serious characterization in his works.

He was awarded Order of the Cross of Takovo and Order of St. Sava of the third and the fourth class.

Works

Comedies
  Two Farthings (Dva cvancika), 1882.
 The Hoax (Podvala), 1885.

Short stories
 Ni oko šta
 Vujina prosidba
 Učitelj
 Redak zver
 Tetka Desa
 Zlosutni broj
 Novi Mesija
 Glava šećera
 Prva brazda
 Posle devedeset godina
 Šetnja posle smrti
 U zao čas
 Svirač 
 Raspis
 Sigurna većina
 Noć na mostu
 Nagraisao
 Roga
 Šilo za ognjilo
 Zadušnice

Translations
 Zla svekrva, Alexander Ostrovsky, 1881. 
 Kola mudrosti, dvoja ludosti, Alexander Ostrovsky, 1882.
 Nov posao, Vladimir Nemirovich-Danchenko, 1883. 
 Sve za sina, Emil Ožje, 1884.
 Naslednik, Emil Ožje, 1884.
 Gavran, Alphonse Daudet, 1888.
 La Peau de chagrin, Honoré de Balzac, 1888.
 Princess Maleine, Maurice Polydore-Marie-Bernard Maeterlinck, 1897.
 La Sanfelice, Alexandre Dumas, 1881.
 Plemićka, Fos, 1882.
 Dead Souls, Nikolai Gogol, 1872.
 Taras Bulba, Nikolai Gogol, 1876.
 Ivan Fyodorovich Shponka and His Aunt, Nikolai Gogol, 1870.
 Oblomov, Ivan Goncharov, 1876.
 The Kreutzer Sonata, Leo Tolstoy, 1890.
 War and Peace, Leo Tolstoy, 1899.
 Narodni borac, unknown author
 Polkanovi memoari, Nikolai Leykin
 Kolombo, Prosper Mérimée, 1877.
 Brđani, Erckmann-Chatrian, 1878.
 Dva brata, Émile Erckmann-Chatrian, 1878.
 Crna kuga, Émile Erckmann-Chatrian, 1878.
 Doctor Ox, Jules Verne, 1878.
 Tartarin of Tarascon, Alphonse Daudet
 Le Nabab, Alphonse Daudet
 The Man-wolf, Erckmann-Chatrian
 L’Invasion ou le Fou Yégof, Erckmann-Chatrian
 Ubistvo u ulici Morg, Edgar Allan Poe
 Srce izdajice, Edgar Allan Poe
 Strahovita noć
 Le Fils de Giboyer, Émile Augier
 La pierre de touche, Émile Augier

Translated works in English
 After Ninety Years: The Story of Serbian Vampire Sava Savanović, 2015, translated by James Lyon
 Tales of Fear and Superstition, 2021, translated by Miloš Pavlović

References

Sources
 Jovan Skerlić, Istorija nove srpske književnosti (Belgrade, 1921) pages 373–378

Serbian literary critics
Literary critics of Serbian
Serbian male poets
Serbian male short story writers
Serbian short story writers
Serbian non-fiction writers
Serbian dramatists and playwrights
Serbian science fiction writers
Serbian translators
Writers from Valjevo
1847 births
1908 deaths
19th-century poets
19th-century Serbian dramatists and playwrights
19th-century translators
19th-century short story writers
Male non-fiction writers